Najara (Najar, Nijar, Nagar, Nagara, Hebrew: נאג'ארה) was the name of an Sephardic Jewish family, originally from Nájera, Spain.
Nájera is on the River Najerilla. Now in La Rioja, at one time it was the capital of kingdom of Navarre.

In the history of rabbinical literature, Najaras are found at Algeria, Tunis, Damascus, Turkey etc.  
Notable people with this family name include:

David Najar
Gonzalo Najar
Israel ben Moses Najara
Judah ben Jacob Najar
Levi Najara
Maimun Najar
Mordecai Najar
Moses Najara I
Moses Najara II
Nathan Najar

External links
Jewish Encyclopedia article on NAJARA

Jewish families
Sephardi families